The War Fund Shield was a Scottish football competition that was contested twice in the spring of 1915 and then again in the spring of 1918 (the Navy and Army War Fund Shield as it then became known). The aim of these competitions was to raise money for the footballers and their families who fought in World War I.

1914–15

Quarter–Finals 
The first round matches took place between 20 October – 1 December 1914. Celtic and Partick Thistle went to a replay. Ibrox Park hosted Clyde against St Mirren.
Third Lanark 0–4 Rangers
Clyde 0–1 St Mirren
Partick Thistle 1–1 Celtic
Celtic 2–1 Partick Thistle (replay)
Morton 3–0 Queen's Park

Semi–Finals 
The first semi-final was a Renfrewshire derby on 8 December 1914. The second semi-final was an Old Firm derby held at Firhill a week later.
Rangers 2–1 Celtic
Morton 1–0 St Mirren

Final 
The final was held at Firhill on 28 April 1915. The attendance was 15,000.
Morton 2–1 Rangers

1917–18

Qualifying round 
The qualifying round matches were held between 9 March – 6 April 1918. St Mirren and Kilmarnock went to extra time.
St Mirren 2–3 Kilmarnock (aet)
Morton 3–1 Third Lanark
Clydebank 2–1 Airdrieonians

Quarter–Finals1 
The first round matches were all held on 20 April 1918.
Celtic 2–1 Queen's Park
Rangers 3–0 Partick Thistle
Morton 7–1 Kilmarnock
Motherwell 1–2 Clydebank

1Not all results were recorded and known

Semi–Finals 
The semi-finals were held on 27 April 1918.
Celtic 2–0 Clydebank
Rangers 1–3 Morton

Final
The final was held at Hampden Park on 4 May 1918 and the attendance was 20,000.
Celtic 1–0 Morton

Aftermath 
Although Celtic officially won the 1917–18 competition the trophy was not presented to them as it was not ready. The competition was supposed to be an annual event but since war had ended the competition was never played again. There is no evidence of Celtic ever being presented with a trophy.

References

External links 
 V is for Victory Cup (1910–19) Jim Craig's Football 50.
 Season 1914–1915 Scotland's War.
 Season 1917–1918 Scotland's War.

Football in Glasgow
Wartime football in Scotland
Defunct football cup competitions in Scotland
1917–18 in Scottish football
1914–15 in Scottish football
Charity football matches
Charity events in the United Kingdom